The Lockheed T2V SeaStar, later called the T-1 SeaStar, is a carrier-capable jet trainer for the United States Navy that entered service in May 1957. Developed from the Lockheed T-33 (itself derived from the Lockheed P-80 Shooting Star), it was powered by one Allison J33 engine.

Design and development

Starting in 1949, the U.S. Navy used the Lockheed T-33 for land-based jet aircraft training. The T-33 was a derivative of the Lockheed P-80/F-80 fighter and was first named TO-2, then TV-2 in Navy service. However, the TV-2 was not suitable for operation from aircraft carriers. The persisting need for a carrier-compatible trainer led to a further, more advanced design development of the P-80/T-33 family, which came into being with the Lockheed designation L-245 and USN designation T2V. Lockheed's demonstrator L-245 first flew on 16 December 1953 and production deliveries to the US Navy began in 1956.

Compared to the T-33/TV-2, the T2V was almost totally re-engineered for carrier landings and at-sea operations with a redesigned tail, naval standard avionics, a strengthened undercarriage (with catapult fittings) and lower fuselage (with a retractable arrestor hook), power-operated leading-edge flaps (to increase lift at low speeds) to allow carrier launches and recoveries, and an elevated rear (instructor's) seat for improved instructor vision, among other changes. Unlike other P-80 derivatives, the T2V could withstand the shock of landing on a pitching carrier deck and had a much higher ability to withstand sea water-related aircraft wear from higher humidity and salt exposure.

Operational history
The only version of the T2V was initially designated T2V-1 when it entered service, but was redesignated T-1A SeaStar under the 1962 United States Tri-Service aircraft designation system, the designation under which it would spend the majority of its career.

The T-1A was replaced by the North American T-2 Buckeye but remained in service into the 1970s.

Operators

 United States Navy
 United States Marine Corps

Surviving aircraft
As of 2017, one T2V-1A airworthy, based at Phoenix-Mesa Gateway Airport (former Williams Air Force Base) in Mesa, Arizona, and being flown for experimental and display purposes. Two examples are preserved on public display in Tucson, Arizona.

Specifications (T2V-1)

See also

References
Notes

Bibliography
 Francillon, René J. Lockheed Aircraft since 1913. London:Putnam, 1982. .
 Ginter, Steve. Lockheed T2V-1/T-1A Seastar. Naval Fighters #42. Simi Valley, California: Ginter Books, 1999. .
 Ogden, Bob. Aviation Museums and Collections of North America. 2007. Air-Britain (Historians) Ltd. .
 Swanborough, Gordon, with Bowers, Peter M. United States Navy Aircraft since 1911. 1990. Putnam Aeronautical Books. .
 Green, William, with Gerald Pollinger. The Aircraft of the World. New York; Doubleday & Co., 1965. P. 255.
 Green, William, with Dennis Punett. MacDonald World Air Power Guide. London; Purnell & Sons, Ltd. (reprinted by Doubleday), 1963. P. 28.

External links

 Naval Aviation Chronology 1954–1959 chapter from United States Naval Aviation 1910–1995 book. 

T02V
1950s United States military trainer aircraft
Single-engined jet aircraft
Low-wing aircraft
Carrier-based aircraft
Aircraft first flown in 1953